Rida Jawad Taqi is an Iraqi politician and served until 2010 as a member of the Council of Representatives of Iraq for the Supreme Islamic Iraqi Council.

He was elected to the Council in December 2005 as part of the United Iraqi Alliance coalition.

Taqi is originally from Karbala and trained as a gas engineer (plumber) to fix houses pipes in London and living on benefits. All of the sudden, he became a public political figure in Iraq. He spent some of his exile in London.

Surprisingly, he was awarded a Diploma equivalent to B.A in Islamic law (Sharia) backdated on 2000-2001 from International College of Islamic science (ICIS) in London, which is run by extremist shia leader in Uk Ayatollah Seyed Mohammad Hadi Hosseini Milani and Iranian Intelligence members.

In December 2002 he was elected to the Follow-Up and Arrangement Committee which grouped Iraqi opposition exiles opposed to the government of President Saddam Hussein. He was listed as a representative of the Islamic Action Organisation, which later joined the United Iraqi Alliance coalition in the Iraqi legislative election of January 2005.

In September 2004 he was active in the negotiations that brought together the various Shi'ite Islamist parties into the United Iraqi Alliance.

In March 2005 he condemned the government of neighbouring Syria for "destabilizing the security in Iraq ... embraced leading figures of the previous regime ... it has provided terrorists with financial and logistical support" He also called for the security forces to be cleared of officers affiliated with the former regime.

In August 2005 he was reported as the head of political relations of the Supreme Council for the Islamic Revolution in Iraq, and was quoted strongly supporting the creation of the Region of Iraq in the south as well as he has an influential and leading role of Asa'ib Ahl al-Haq and Supreme Council for the Islamic Revolution in Iraq armed wing. .

In August 2007, it was reported that Jawd Taqi's son, Amir Taqi, had been arrested by Saudi police whilst on pilgrimage to Mecca because he is on the black list as a war and sectarian criminal against Sunni in Iraq.

References

See also the references listed in the linked articles

https://www.globalsecurity.org/wmd/library/news/iraq/2004/09/iraq-040920-rferl02.htm

http://www.harrowtimes.co.uk/news/300876.Man_and_his_in_laws_conspired_to_con_council/

British people of Iraqi descent
Politicians from Karbala
Iraqi Shia Muslims
Members of the Council of Representatives of Iraq
Islamic Supreme Council of Iraq politicians
Living people
British Shia Muslims
Year of birth missing (living people)